Robert James Reynolds (born April 19, 1959) is a former outfielder in Major League Baseball. He played with the Los Angeles Dodgers and the Pittsburgh Pirates, from 1983 to 1990. He also played in Japan for the Yokohama Taiyo Whales and Kintetsu Buffaloes, from 1991 to 1993.

Career
Reynolds broke in as a September call-up with the Dodgers in 1983. On September 11, Reynolds' suicide squeeze bunt in the bottom of the ninth inning helped the Dodgers defeat the Atlanta Braves amid the pennant race. The Dodgers finished three games ahead of the second-place Braves.

Reynolds spent 1984 and most of 1985 with the Dodgers, playing in more than half the team's games. On August 31, 1985, just before the trade deadline, the Dodgers obtained third baseman Bill Madlock from the Pirates to shore up their run for the playoffs. Three days later, Reynolds was sent to Pittsburgh (along with Cecil Espy and Sid Bream) as a player to be named later.

Leading off the Pirates 1986 season opener, Reynolds hit a home run off of the New York Mets' Dwight Gooden. He played in all six games of the 1990 NLCS, getting two hits and two walks in ten at-bats as the Pirates fell to the eventual champion Cincinnati Reds.

After the 1990 season, Reynolds did not re-sign with the Pirates or any other Major League team.  He played for three years in Japan before retiring at age 34.

In 786 games over eight seasons, Reynolds posted a .267 batting average (605-for-2270) with 288 runs, 35 home runs, 294 RBIs, 109 stolen bases and 190 bases on balls. He finished his career with a .973 fielding percentage playing at all three outfield positions.

Notes

External links

1959 births
Living people
African-American baseball managers
African-American baseball players
Albuquerque Dukes players
American expatriate baseball players in Japan
American expatriate baseball players in Mexico
Baseball players from Sacramento, California
Kintetsu Buffaloes players
Leones de Yucatán players
Lodi Dodgers players
Los Angeles Dodgers players
Major League Baseball outfielders
Minor league baseball managers
Nippon Professional Baseball outfielders
Pittsburgh Pirates players
Rieleros de Aguascalientes players
Sacramento City Panthers baseball players
San Antonio Dodgers players
Sultanes de Monterrey players
Vero Beach Dodgers players
Yokohama Taiyō Whales players
21st-century African-American people
20th-century African-American sportspeople